Potamilus alatus, the pink heelsplitter, is a species of freshwater mussel, an aquatic bivalve mollusk in the family Unionidae, commonly known as the river mussels.

This species is native to eastern North America. It is found in the drainages of the Ohio River, the St. Lawrence River, the Great Lakes, and the Canadian Interior Basin.

References

Molluscs of the United States
Molluscs of Canada
alatus
Bivalves described in 1817
Taxonomy articles created by Polbot